Mirigama (also spelled Meerigama) is a town in Gampaha District, Sri Lanka.

Mirigama is the hometown of Sri Lanka's first Prime Minister, D. S. Senanayake and former speaker of the Parliament of Sri Lanka Karu Jayasuriya.

Economy 
Mirigama is an economic hub in the region and is a popular shopping center. It also has a large number of businesses and public institutions, which results in a large population and a large number of people commuting to and from the city daily.

Transport 
The city is located on the AB29, which connects the A1 Colombo - Kandy road with the B322 Ja-Ela - Kurunegala road. The B324 (Mirigama - Negombo road) is one of the main roads that originate from the town. Mirigama - Kotadeniyawa road and Mirigama - Nalla road are another roads linked to Mirigama. Mirigama is connected to Warakapola in Kegalle district. Mirigama - Danowita and Mirigama - Weweldeniya roads are connected road of Colombo to Kandy. Mirigama Railway Station is a major railway station on the Main Line and has frequent rail connections to Colombo, Badulla, Hatton, Kandy, Maho, Polgahawela and Rambukkana among others. A regular train trip from Mirigama to Colombo takes approximately 1 hour 20 mins. An express train ride from Mirigama to Colombo roughly takes about 1 hour. The proposed electric rail system is expected to cut this time down to 25 mins.

The Central Expressway (under construction as of June 2018) includes two interchanges serving Mirigama: Mirigama North and Mirigama South.

Places
SLAF Mirigama
The Mirigama Super Race Track (commonly known as the Kanway Autodrome) - national-level race track,  in length.
Sri Lanka Army Base,  Ambepussa

Schools
 D.S.Senanayake Central College Mirigama ,www.facebook.com/DsSenanayakaCollegeMirigama. ,https://www.facebook.com/groups/mirigamaDS/
 Bandaranayake Maha Vidyalaya
 Bothale Kanishta Vidyalaya
 Dudley Senanayake Adarsha Maha Vidyalaya
 Henepola Kanishta Vidyalaya
 Kaleliya Maha Vidyalaya
 Kandangamuwa Maha Vidyalaya
 Keenadeniya Maha Vidyalaya
 Pallewela Maha Vidyalaya
 Sri Vimalawansha Kanishta Vidyalaya

Industries
Mirigama has been identified as one of the major industrialized towns in Sri Lanka from as far as the 1980s. This is primarily due to its location in a slightly hilly countryside, the presence of a Board Of Investment and an Industrial Zone and its proximity to the Bandaranayake International Airport. The factories as of January 2019 are;

Cargills - Magic Ice Cream Factory
Damro - Innovex Machinery Factory
Damro - Furniture Factory
Damro - Daxer Polymer Factory
Brandix - Textile Manufacturing Facility
Courtaulds - Textile Manufacturing Facility
SilverMill - International Exporter in Organic Products
Tamasha - International Exporter in Organic Sauces
Aussie Oats Milling - International Food Processing Company
Lalan Rubbers - Rubber Processing Plant
Ceylon Shell Flour - Flour Processing Plant
Amtrad - International Concrete Exporter
DR Exports - Furniture Manufacturer
Etna Rubber Exports - Rubber Exporter

Web Site 

 Mirigama

Social Media Group
Mirigama Api

Notable residents
D.S. Senanayake - First Prime Minister of Ceylon
Karu Jayasuriya, MP - Former Speaker of the Parliament of Sri Lanka
Kokila Gunawardene MP
Mahendra Wijerathne MP
Udena Wijerathne MPC

References